Gordon Harry Gregory (24 October 1943 – 6 June 2016) was an English footballer who played as a midfielder in the Football League.

Gregory died on 6 June 2016, aged 72.

Personal life
Gregory's grandson, Reggie, currently plays for Chelmsford City.

References

External links
Harry Gregory's Career

1943 births
2016 deaths
English footballers
Footballers from Hackney, London
Association football midfielders
Charlton Athletic F.C. players
Leyton Orient F.C. players
Aston Villa F.C. players
Hereford United F.C. players
Chelmsford City F.C. players
English Football League players
Deaths from cancer in England